is a motorcycle racing video game from Irem for the Game Boy handheld, released in 1991 exclusively in Japan. The game features tracks all over Japan.

Racing Damashii was also released for the PC Engine.

See also
 MotoRace USA
 List of PC Engine games
 List of games for the original Game Boy
 Bari Bari Densetsu
 GP-1
 GP-1: Part II

References

External links
Racing Damashii at MobyGames

1991 video games
Game Boy games
Irem games
Japan-exclusive video games
Motorcycle video games
TurboGrafx-16 games
Video games developed in Japan
Video games set in Japan
Multiplayer and single-player video games